Forever Yours is a 1945 American drama film directed by William Nigh and starring Gale Storm, C. Aubrey Smith and Johnny Mack Brown. It was made by Monogram Pictures. Although the studio concentrated on low-budget films, this was one of the company's more prestigious releases of the year. A young singer is stricken by paralysis and loses the will to live.

Cast
 Gale Storm as Joan Randall 
 C. Aubrey Smith as Grandfather 
 Johnny Mack Brown as Maj. Tex O'Connor 
 Conrad Nagel as Dr. Randall 
 Mary Boland as Aunt Mary 
 Frank Craven as Uncle Charles 
 Johnny Downs as Ricky 
 Catherine McLeod as Martha 
 Selmer Jackson as Williams 
 Matt Willis as Alabam 
 Leo Diamond as Leo Diamond 
 The Harmonaires as The Harmonaires

References

Bibliography
 Michael S. Shull. Hollywood War Films, 1937–1945: An Exhaustive Filmography of American Feature-Length Motion Pictures Relating to World War II. McFarland, 2006.

External links
 

1945 films
1945 drama films
1940s English-language films
American drama films
Films directed by William Nigh
American black-and-white films
1940s American films